Nevsun Resources Ltd was a Canadian diversified mid-tier miner with a portfolio of base metal assets. The company was acquired by Zijin Mining Group Company Limited on December 29, 2018. The company's three principal assets are its ownership interest in the Timok Project, a high-grade copper-gold development project in Serbia, its Bisha zinc-copper mine in Eritrea, and its balance sheet. The company also holds a number of additional exploration licences and permits in Serbia, Macedonia, and in the Bisha mining district.

Operations

 The Timok Project was acquired through the acquisition of Reservoir Minerals Inc on June 23, 2016, and is a joint venture between Nevsun and Freeport-McMoRan Exploration Corporation (“Freeport”).
 The  Bisha  Mine is a volcanogenic massive sulfide ore deposit which has been in production since February 2011. The mine focuses on extracting gold, copper ore, and zinc.

Human rights violations
In November 2014, three former employees of the Bisha Mine filed a civil suit in British Columbia against Nevsun Resources for complicity in torture, forced labour, slavery, and crimes against humanity.

Company CEO Cliff Davis responded, saying: "We are confident that the allegations are unfounded. Based on various company-led and third party audits, the Bisha Mine has adhered at all times to international standards of governance, workplace conditions, and health and safety. We are committed to ensuring that the Bisha Mine is managed in a safe and responsible manner that respects the interests of local communities, workers, national governance, stakeholders, and the natural environment."
Nevsun has previously received criticism from Human Rights Watch for failing to exercise proper human rights due diligence when engaging with a country where forced labour is allegedly practiced.

A Human Rights Watch report released in January 2013 found that Nevsun Resources failed to take the risks of forced labour seriously and then struggled to address allegations of abuse connected to the Bisha Mine in Eritrea. Eritrea's government maintains a “national service” program that conscripts Eritreans into prolonged and indefinite terms of forced labor, generally under abusive conditions. It is through this forced labor program that mining companies run the most direct risk of involvement in the Eritrean government's human rights violations.

In 2016, the Supreme Court of British Columbia ruled that the case against Nevsun can proceed in the Canadian courts. The decision was upheld on appeal to the British Columbia Court of Appeal in November 2017. On January 26, 2018, Nevsun sought leave to appeal to the Supreme Court of Canada. In February 2020, the Supreme Court upheld the decision from the British Columbia Court of Appeal in Nevsun Resources Ltd v Araya, stating that the case against Nevsun can proceed in Canadian courts.

See also
 Land restoration
 Mine closure planning

References

External links
 

Companies formerly listed on the Toronto Stock Exchange
Mining companies of Canada
Companies based in Vancouver